The A153 is a non-primary A road entirely in Lincolnshire in the east of England.

Route description 
The A153 starts at the T-junction with the A607 at Honington and heads east to Sleaford, passing a crossroads with the B6403 – the Roman Ermine Street. Between Honington and Sleaford the road roughly follows the rail line through the River Slea valley. The road briefly ends at Sleaford which is bypassed by the A15 and A17 before remerging at Bone Mill Junction along the A17, heading north from there. Before the bypasses were built, the road went through Sleaford; this route is now the B1517. After leaving Sleaford the road goes through the villages of Anwick, North Kyme and Billinghay before crossing the River Witham and reaching Tattershall and Coningsby. From there the road follows the Bain Valley north towards the town of Horncastle where it intersects the busy A158, causing frequent traffic jams. Often in the summer months on Bank Holidays they can be miles long. The road leaves Horncastle and briefly continues to follow the Bain Valley before crossing over the breadth of the Lincolnshire Wolds and terminating at the A16 Louth bypass

References 

Roads in England
Roads in Lincolnshire